WOH S264 ([W60] B90) is a large, highly luminous red supergiant star in the Large Magellanic Cloud.

Discovery
WOH S264 was discovered in 1956 by Karl Gordon Henize in a catalogue of H-alpha emission stars and nebulae in the Large Magellanic Cloud.  He designated it LHA 120-N 132E, indicating emission line nebula 132E on plate 120.  The LHA is originally LHα, standing for H-alpha emission objects identified at the Lamont-Hussey Observatory.

The designation WOH S264 indicates that it is supergiant 264 in a 1981 survey by Westerlund, Olander, and Hedin.

Properties
WOH S264 is believed to be one of the largest, most luminous red supergiants in the Large Magellanic Cloud with a luminosity of more than 280,000 solar luminosities and a radius of around 1,390 solar radii. It needs further investigation to constrain the luminosity and radius with higher certainty.

See also
 WOH G64
 WOH G17
 WOH S279
 WOH S281

References

M-type supergiants
Stars in the Large Magellanic Cloud
TIC objects
J05241931-6938492